On 30 April 2012, a ferry carrying about 350 passengers capsized in the Brahmaputra River in the Dhubri district of Assam in Northeast India. The disaster killed at least 103 people.

Incident
According to official, the incident occurred when a packed steamer carrying over 300 passengers was caught in a storm and subsequently capsized. According To BBC news , Poor safety standards mean ferry accidents are common on the river but that this is one of the worst disasters in recent memory. The Superintendent of Police, Pradip Saloi, told The Hindu: "The ferry, originating from Dhubri and going towards Hatsingimari, capsized near Fakirganj. We are not sure about the actual number of passengers. We have been told that there were 250–300 passengers. However, there were reports of many swimming to safety." Reuters reported that a police officer had said that the ferry had neither lifeboats nor life jackets and was overloaded with people and goods. Most of the passengers were farmers and farm families from the local area.

A survivor said passengers had begged the skipper to beach the ferry on a sandbar when the storm hit midstream, but he refused. "Then the storm became more intense and the boat split into two parts before sinking," Ali was quoted as saying by Channel 4 News.

According to India's National Disaster Response Force (NDRF), the bodies of 103 victims were recovered by the NDRF personnel and the Border Security Force near Jaleswar. Assam Chief Minister Tarun Gogoi said that the death toll was likely to rise. The dead bodies have been kept at the Dhubri Civil Hospital.

Response
Following the incident, the Indian Army, National Disaster Response Force and the Border Security Force launched rescue efforts. The Government of Assam announced a 150,000 compensation for the victims. State Transport Minister Chandan Brahma said,'Besides, 50,000 would be given to those boat passengers who sustained serious injuries and all those admitted in hospitals would receive free treatment.' He added, 'Anybody found guilty of any violation of rule would not be spared.' The President of India Pratibha Patil expressed grief over the incident, whereas Prime Minister Manmohan Singh assured the Chief Minister of Assam, Tarun Gogoi, that all help and funds for relief for the families of the victims will be provided while announcing the assistance of 200,000 to the next kin of each of the deceased.

The Indian Army sent twelve divers for search operations along with army engineers and soldiers. The Army also provided food to the local people, thousands of whom gathered at the spot to help in the rescue efforts.

References

2012 disasters in India
April 2012 events in India
2010s in Assam
Maritime incidents in 2012
Maritime incidents in India
Shipwrecks in rivers
Dhubri district
Brahmaputra River
Transport in Assam
Disasters in Assam